One male athlete from Macau competed at the 1996 Summer Paralympics in Atlanta, United States.

See also
Macau at the Paralympics

References 

Nations at the 1996 Summer Paralympics
1996
Summer Paralympics